Ophisma pyrosticha is a moth of the family Noctuidae first described by Herbert Druce in 1912. It is found in South America, including Peru.

References

Ophiusina